Sodium ethoxide, also referred to as sodium ethylate, is the ionic, organic compound with the formula , or NaOEt (Et = ethane). It is a white solid, although impure samples appear yellow or brown. It dissolves in polar solvents such as ethanol.  It is commonly used as a strong base.

Preparation
Few procedures have been reported to prepare the anhydrous solid.  Instead the material is typically prepared in a solution with ethanol.  It is commercially available and as a solution in ethanol. It is easily prepared in the laboratory by treating sodium metal with absolute ethanol:

 

The reaction of sodium hydroxide with anhydrous ethanol suffers from incomplete conversion to the alkoxide.

Structure
The crystal structure of sodium ethoxide has been determined by X-ray crystallography. It consists of layers of alternating Na+ and O− centres with disordered ethyl groups covering the top and bottom of each layer. The ethyl layers pack back-to-back resulting in a lamellar structure. The reaction of sodium and ethanol sometimes forms other products such as the disolvate NaOEt·2EtOH. Its crystal structure has been determined, although the structure of other phases in the Na/EtOH system remain unknown.

Reactions
Sodium ethoxide is commonly used as a base in the Claisen condensation and malonic ester synthesis. Sodium ethoxide may either deprotonate the α-position of an ester molecule, forming an enolate, or the ester molecule may undergo a nucleophilic substitution called transesterification. If the starting material is an ethyl ester, trans-esterification is irrelevant since the product is identical to the starting material. In practice, the alcohol/alkoxide solvating mixture must match the alkoxy components of the reacting esters to minimize the number of different products.

Many alkoxides are prepared by salt metathesis from sodium ethoxide.

Stability
Sodium ethoxide is prone to reaction with both water and carbon dioxide in the air. This leads to degradation of stored samples over time, even in solid form. The physical appearance of degraded samples may not be obvious, but samples of sodium ethoxide gradually turn dark on storage. It has been reported that even newly-obtained commercial batches of sodium ethoxide show variable levels of degradation, and responsible as a major source of irreproducibility when used in Suzuki reactions.In moist air, NaOEt hydrolyses rapidly to sodium hydroxide (NaOH). The conversion is not obvious and typical samples of NaOEt are contaminated with NaOH. 

In moisture-free air, solid sodium ethoxide can form sodium ethyl carbonate from fixation of carbon dioxide from the air. Further reactions lead to degradation into a variety of other sodium salts and diethyl ether.

This instability can be prevented by storing sodium ethoxide under an inert atmosphere.

Safety
Sodium ethoxide is a strong base, and is therefore corrosive.

See also
 Alkoxide

References

Ethoxides
Organic sodium salts